The history of theatre charts the development of theatre over the past 2,500 years. While performative elements are present in every society, it is customary to acknowledge a distinction between theatre as an art form and entertainment and theatrical or performative elements in other activities. The history of theatre is primarily concerned with the origin and subsequent development of the theatre as an autonomous activity. Since classical Athens in the 5th century BC, vibrant traditions of theatre have flourished in cultures across the world.

Origins
There is no conclusive evidence that theater evolved from ritual, despite the similarities between the performance of ritual actions and theatre and the significance of this relationship. This similarity of early theatre to ritual is negatively attested by Aristotle, who in his Poetics defined theatre in contrast to the performances of sacred mysteries: theatre did not require the spectator to fast, drink the kykeon, or march in a procession; however theatre did resemble the sacred mysteries in the sense that it brought purification and healing to the spectator by means of a vision, the theama. The physical location of such performances was accordingly named theatron.

According to the historians Oscar Brockett and Franklin Hildy, rituals typically include elements that entertain or give pleasure, such as costumes and masks as well as skilled performers. As societies grew more complex, these spectacular elements began to be acted out under non-ritualistic conditions. As this occurred, the first steps towards theatre as an autonomous activity were being taken.

European theatre

Greek theatre

Greek theatre, most developed in Athens, is the root of the Western tradition; theatre is a word of Greek origin. It was part of a broader culture of theatricality and performance in classical Greece that included festivals, religious rituals, politics, law, athletics and gymnastics, music, poetry, weddings, funerals, and symposia. Participation in the city-state's many festivals—and attendance at the City Dionysia as an audience member (or even as a participant in the theatrical productions) in particular—was an important part of citizenship. Civic participation also involved the evaluation of the rhetoric of orators evidenced in performances in the law-court or political assembly, both of which were understood as analogous to the theatre and increasingly came to absorb its dramatic vocabulary. The theatre of ancient Greece consisted of three types of drama: tragedy, comedy, and the satyr play.

Athenian tragedy—the oldest surviving form of tragedy—is a type of dance-drama that formed an important part of the theatrical culture of the city-state. Having emerged sometime during the 6th century BC, it flowered during the 5th century BC (from the end of which it began to spread throughout the Greek world) and continued to be popular until the beginning of the Hellenistic period. No tragedies from the 6th century and only 32 of the more than a thousand that were performed in during the 5th century have survived. We have complete texts extant by Aeschylus, Sophocles, and Euripides. The origins of tragedy remain obscure, though by the 5th century it was institutionalised in competitions (agon) held as part of festivities celebrating Dionysos (the god of wine and fertility). As contestants in the City Dionysia's competition (the most prestigious of the festivals to stage drama), playwrights were required to present a tetralogy of plays (though the individual works were not necessarily connected by story or theme), which usually consisted of three tragedies and one satyr play. The performance of tragedies at the City Dionysia may have begun as early as 534 BC; official records (didaskaliai) begin from 501 BC, when the satyr play was introduced.  Most Athenian tragedies dramatise events from Greek mythology, though The Persians—which stages the Persian response to news of their military defeat at the Battle of Salamis in 480 BC—is the notable exception in the surviving drama. When Aeschylus won first prize for it at the City Dionysia in 472 BC, he had been writing tragedies for more than 25 years, yet its tragic treatment of recent history is the earliest example of drama to survive. More than 130 years later, the philosopher Aristotle analysed 5th-century Athenian tragedy in the oldest surviving work of dramatic theory—his Poetics (c. 335 BC). Athenian comedy is conventionally divided into three periods, "Old Comedy", "Middle Comedy", and "New Comedy". Old Comedy survives today largely in the form of the eleven surviving plays of Aristophanes, while Middle Comedy is largely lost (preserved only in relatively short fragments in authors such as Athenaeus of Naucratis). New Comedy is known primarily from the substantial papyrus fragments of plays by Menander. Aristotle defined comedy as a representation of laughable people that involves some kind of error or ugliness that does not cause pain or destruction.

Roman theatre

Western theatre developed and expanded considerably under the Romans. The Roman historian Livy wrote that the Romans first experienced theatre in the 4th century BC, with a performance by Etruscan actors. Beacham argues that Romans had been familiar with "pre-theatrical practices" for some time before that recorded contact. The theatre of ancient Rome was a thriving and diverse art form, ranging from festival performances of street theatre, nude dancing, and acrobatics, to the staging of Plautus's broadly appealing situation comedies, to the high-style, verbally elaborate tragedies of Seneca. Although Rome had a native tradition of performance, the Hellenization of Roman culture in the 3rd century BC had a profound and energizing effect on Roman theatre and encouraged the development of Latin literature of the highest quality for the stage.

Following the expansion of the Roman Republic (509–27 BC) into several Greek territories between 270 and 240 BC, Rome encountered Greek drama. From the later years of the republic and by means of the Roman Empire (27 BC-476 AD), theatre spread west across Europe, around the Mediterranean and reached England; Roman theatre was more varied, extensive and sophisticated than that of any culture before it. While Greek drama continued to be performed throughout the Roman period, the year 240 BC marks the beginning of regular Roman drama. From the beginning of the empire, however, interest in full-length drama declined in favour of a broader variety of theatrical entertainments.

The first important works of Roman literature were the tragedies and comedies that Livius Andronicus wrote from 240 BC. Five years later, Gnaeus Naevius also began to write drama. No plays from either writer have survived. While both dramatists composed in both genres, Andronicus was most appreciated for his tragedies and Naevius for his comedies; their successors tended to specialise in one or the other, which led to a separation of the subsequent development of each type of drama. By the beginning of the 2nd century BC, drama was firmly established in Rome and a guild of writers (collegium poetarum) had been formed.

The Roman comedies that have survived are all fabula palliata (comedies based on Greek subjects) and come from two dramatists: Titus Maccius Plautus (Plautus) and Publius Terentius Afer (Terence). In re-working the Greek originals, the Roman comic dramatists abolished the role of the chorus in dividing the drama into episodes and introduced musical accompaniment to its dialogue (between one-third of the dialogue in the comedies of Plautus and two-thirds in those of Terence). The action of all scenes is set in the exterior location of a street and its complications often follow from eavesdropping. Plautus, the more popular of the two, wrote between 205 and 184 BC and twenty of his comedies survive, of which his farces are best known; he was admired for the wit of his dialogue and his use of a variety of poetic meters. All of the six comedies that Terence wrote between 166 and 160 BC have survived; the complexity of his plots, in which he often combined several Greek originals, was sometimes denounced, but his double-plots enabled a sophisticated presentation of contrasting human behaviour.

No early Roman tragedy survives, though it was highly regarded in its day; historians know of three early tragedians—Quintus Ennius, Marcus Pacuvius and Lucius Accius. From the time of the empire, the work of two tragedians survives—one is an unknown author, while the other is the Stoic philosopher Seneca. Nine of Seneca's tragedies survive, all of which are fabula crepidata (tragedies adapted from Greek originals); his Phaedra, for example, was based on Euripides' Hippolytus. Historians do not know who wrote the only extant example of the fabula praetexta (tragedies based on Roman subjects), Octavia, but in former times it was mistakenly attributed to Seneca due to his appearance as a character in the tragedy.

In contrast to Ancient Greek theatre, the theatre in Ancient Rome did allow female performers. While the majority were employed for dancing and singing, a minority of actresses are known to have performed speaking roles, and there were actresses who achieved wealth, fame and recognition for their art, such as Eucharis, Dionysia, Galeria Copiola and Fabia Arete: they also formed their own acting guild, the Sociae Mimae, which was evidently quite wealthy.

Transition and early medieval theatre, 500–1050

As the Western Roman Empire fell into decay through the 4th and 5th centuries, the seat of Roman power shifted to Constantinople and the Eastern Roman Empire, today called the Byzantine Empire. While surviving evidence about Byzantine theatre is slight, existing records show that miming, scenes or recitations from tragedies and comedies, dances, and other entertainments were very popular. Constantinople had two theatres that were in use as late as the 5th century. However, the true importance of the Byzantines in theatrical history is their preservation of many classical Greek texts and the compilation of a massive encyclopedia called the Suda, from which is derived a large amount of contemporary information on Greek theatre.

From the 5th century, Western Europe was plunged into a period of general disorder that lasted (with a brief period of stability under the Carolingian Empire in the 9th century) until the 10th century. As such, most organized theatrical activities disappeared in Western Europe. While it seems that small nomadic bands travelled around Europe throughout the period, performing wherever they could find an audience, there is no evidence that they produced anything but crude scenes. These performers were denounced by the Church during the Dark Ages as they were viewed as dangerous and pagan.

By the Early Middle Ages, churches in Europe began staging dramatized versions of particular biblical events on specific days of the year. These dramatizations were included in order to vivify annual celebrations. Symbolic objects and actions – vestments, altars, censers, and pantomime performed by priests – recalled the events which Christian ritual celebrates. These were extensive sets of visual signs that could be used to communicate with a largely illiterate audience. These performances developed into liturgical dramas, the earliest of which is the Whom do you Seek (Quem-Quaeritis) Easter trope, dating from ca. 925. Liturgical drama was sung responsively by two groups and did not involve actors impersonating characters. However, sometime between 965 and 975, Æthelwold of Winchester composed the Regularis Concordia (Monastic Agreement) which contains a playlet complete with directions for performance.

Hrosvitha (c. 935 – 973), a canoness in northern Germany, wrote six plays modeled on Terence's comedies but using religious subjects. These six plays – Abraham, Callimachus, Dulcitius, Gallicanus, Paphnutius, and Sapientia – are the first known plays composed by a female dramatist and the first identifiable Western dramatic works of the post-classical era. They were first published in 1501 and had considerable influence on religious and didactic plays of the sixteenth century. Hrosvitha was followed by Hildegard of Bingen (d. 1179), a Benedictine abbess, who wrote a Latin musical drama called Ordo Virtutum in 1155.

High and late medieval theatre, 1050–1500

As the Viking invasions ceased in the middle of the 11th century, liturgical drama had spread from Russia to Scandinavia to Italy. Only in Muslim-occupied Iberian Peninsula were liturgical dramas not presented at all. Despite the large number of liturgical dramas that have survived from the period, many churches would have only performed one or two per year and a larger number never performed any at all.

The Feast of Fools was especially important in the development of comedy. The festival inverted the status of the lesser clergy and allowed them to ridicule their superiors and the routine of church life. Sometimes plays were staged as part of the occasion and a certain amount of burlesque and comedy crept into these performances. Although comic episodes had to truly wait until the separation of drama from the liturgy, the Feast of Fools undoubtedly had a profound effect on the development of comedy in both religious and secular plays.

Performance of religious plays outside of the church began sometime in the 12th century through a traditionally accepted process of merging shorter liturgical dramas into longer plays which were then translated into vernacular and performed by laymen. The Mystery of Adam  (1150) gives credence to this theory as its detailed stage direction suggest that it was staged outdoors. A number of other plays from the period survive, including La Seinte Resurrection (Norman), The Play of the Magi Kings (Spanish), and Sponsus (French).

The importance of the High Middle Ages in the development of theatre was the economic and political changes that led to the formation of guilds and the growth of towns. This would lead to significant changes in the Late Middle Ages. In the British Isles, plays were produced in some 127 different towns during the Middle Ages. These vernacular Mystery plays were written in cycles of a large number of plays: York (48 plays), Chester (24), Wakefield (32) and Unknown (42). A larger number of plays survive from France and Germany in this period and some type of religious dramas were performed in nearly every European country in the Late Middle Ages. Many of these plays contained comedy, devils, villains and clowns.

The majority of actors in these plays were drawn from the local population. For example, at Valenciennes in 1547, more than 100 roles were assigned to 72 actors. Plays were staged on pageant wagon stages, which were platforms mounted on wheels used to move scenery. Often providing their own costumes, amateur performers in England were exclusively male, but other countries had female performers. The platform stage, which was an unidentified space and not a specific locale, allowed for abrupt changes in location.

Morality plays emerged as a distinct dramatic form around 1400 and flourished until 1550. The most interesting morality play is The Castle of Perseverance which depicts mankind's progress from birth to death. However, the most famous morality play and perhaps best known medieval drama is Everyman. Everyman receives Death's summons, struggles to escape and finally resigns himself to necessity. Along the way, he is deserted by Kindred, Goods, and Fellowship – only Good Deeds goes with him to the grave.

There were also a number of secular performances staged in the Middle Ages, the earliest of which is The Play of the Greenwood by Adam de la Halle in 1276. It contains satirical scenes and folk material such as faeries and other supernatural occurrences. Farces also rose dramatically in popularity after the 13th century. The majority of these plays come from France and Germany and are similar in tone and form, emphasizing sex and bodily excretions. The best known playwright of farces is Hans Sachs (1494–1576) who wrote 198 dramatic works. In England, The Second Shepherds' Play of the Wakefield Cycle is the best known early farce. However, farce did not appear independently in England until the 16th century with the work of John Heywood (1497–1580).

A significant forerunner of the development of Elizabethan drama was the Chambers of Rhetoric in the Low Countries. These societies were concerned with poetry, music and drama and held contests to see which society could compose the best drama in relation to a question posed.

At the end of the Late Middle Ages, professional actors began to appear in England and Europe. Richard III and Henry VII both maintained small companies of professional actors. Their plays were performed in the Great Hall of a nobleman's residence, often with a raised platform at one end for the audience and a "screen" at the other for the actors. Also important were Mummers' plays, performed during the Christmas season, and court masques. These masques were especially popular during the reign of Henry VIII who had a House of Revels built and an Office of Revels established in 1545.

The end of medieval drama came about due to a number of factors, including the weakening power of the Catholic Church, the Protestant Reformation and the banning of religious plays in many countries. Elizabeth I forbid all religious plays in 1558 and the great cycle plays had been silenced by the 1580s. Similarly, religious plays were banned in the Netherlands in 1539, the Papal States in 1547 and in Paris in 1548. The abandonment of these plays destroyed the international theatre that had thereto existed and forced each country to develop its own form of drama. It also allowed dramatists to turn to secular subjects and the reviving interest in Greek and Roman theatre provided them with the perfect opportunity.

Italian Commedia dell'arte and Renaissance

Commedia dell'arte was an early form of professional theatre, originating from Italian theatre, that was popular throughout Europe between the 16th and 18th centuries. Characterized by masked "types",  was responsible for the rise of actresses such as Isabella Andreini and improvised performances based on sketches or scenarios. A , such as The Tooth Puller, is both scripted and improvised. Characters' entrances and exits are scripted.

The characters of the  usually represent fixed social types and stock characters, such as foolish old men, devious servants, or military officers full of false bravado. The characters are exaggerated "real characters", such as a know-it-all doctor called Il Dottore, a greedy old man called Pantalone, or a perfect relationship like the Innamorati. The form of theatre originated in Italy, but travelled throughout Europe - sometimes to as far away as Moscow.

In the Flaminio Scala scenario, for example, Il Magnifico persists and is interchangeable with Pantalone into the 17th century. While Calmo's characters (which also included the Spanish Capitano and a  type) were not masked, it is uncertain at what point the characters donned the mask. However, the connection to carnival (the period between Epiphany and Ash Wednesday) would suggest that masking was a convention of carnival and was applied at some point. The tradition in Northern Italy is centred in Florence, Mantua, and Venice, where the major companies came under the protection of the various dukes. Concomitantly, a Neapolitan tradition emerged in the south and featured the prominent stage figure Pulcinella, which has been long associated with Naples and derived into various types elsewhere—most famously as the puppet character Punch (of the eponymous Punch and Judy shows) in England.

The commedia dell’arte allowed professional women to perform early on: Lucrezia Di Siena, whose name is on a contract of actors from 1564, has been referred to as the first Italian actress known by name, with Vincenza Armani and Barbara Flaminia as the first primadonna and the well-documented actresses in Europe.

English Elizabethan theatre

Renaissance theatre derived from several medieval theatre traditions, such as, the mystery plays that formed a part of religious festivals in England and other parts of Europe during the Middle Ages. Other sources include the "morality plays" and the "University drama" that attempted to recreate Athenian tragedy. The Italian tradition of Commedia dell'arte, as well as the elaborate masques frequently presented at court, also contributed to the shaping of public theatre.

Since before the reign of Elizabeth I, companies of players were attached to households of leading aristocrats and performed seasonally in various locations. These became the foundation for the professional players that performed on the Elizabethan stage. The tours of these players gradually replaced the performances of the mystery and morality plays by local players, and a 1572 law eliminated the remaining companies lacking formal patronage by labelling them vagabonds.

The City of London authorities were generally hostile to public performances, but its hostility was overmatched by the Queen's taste for plays and the Privy Council's support. Theatres sprang up in suburbs, especially in the liberty of Southwark, accessible across the Thames to city dwellers but beyond the authority's control. The companies maintained the pretence that their public performances were mere rehearsals for the frequent performances before the Queen, but while the latter did grant prestige, the former were the real source of the income for the professional players.

Along with the economics of the profession, the character of the drama changed toward the end of the period. Under Elizabeth, the drama was a unified expression as far as social class was concerned: the Court watched the same plays the commoners saw in the public playhouses. With the development of the private theatres, drama became more oriented toward the tastes and values of an upper-class audience. By the later part of the reign of Charles I, few new plays were being written for the public theatres, which sustained themselves on the accumulated works of the previous decades.

Puritan opposition to the stage (informed by the arguments of the early Church Fathers who had written screeds against the decadent and violent entertainments of the Romans) argued not only that the stage in general was pagan, but that any play that represented a religious figure was inherently idolatrous. In 1642, at the outbreak of the English Civil War, the Puritan authorities banned the performance of all plays within the city limits of London. A sweeping assault against the alleged immoralities of the theatre crushed whatever remained in England of the dramatic tradition.

Spanish Golden age theatre

During its Golden Age, roughly from 1590 to 1681, Spain saw a monumental increase in the production of live theatre as well as in the importance of theatre within Spanish society. It was an accessible art form for all participants in Renaissance Spain, being both highly sponsored by the aristocratic class and highly attended by the lower classes. The volume and variety of Spanish plays during the Golden Age was unprecedented in the history of world theatre, surpassing, for example, the dramatic production of the English Renaissance by a factor of at least four. Although this volume has been as much a source of criticism as praise for Spanish Golden Age theatre, for emphasizing quantity before quality, a large number of the 10,000 to 30,000 plays of this period are still considered masterpieces.

Major artists of the period included Lope de Vega, a contemporary of Shakespeare, often, and contemporaneously, seen his parallel for the Spanish stage, and Calderon de la Barca, inventor of the zarzuela and Lope's successor as the preeminent Spanish dramatist. Gil Vicente, Lope de Rueda, and Juan del Encina helped to establish the foundations of Spanish theatre in the mid-sixteenth centuries, while Francisco de Rojas Zorrilla and Tirso de Molina made significant contributions in the latter half of the Golden Age. Important performers included Lope de Rueda (previously mentioned among the playwrights) and later Juan Rana.

The sources of influence for the emerging national theatre of Spain were as diverse as the theatre that nation ended up producing. Storytelling traditions originating in Italian Commedia dell'arte and the uniquely Spanish expression of Western Europe's traveling minstrel entertainments contributed a populist influence on the narratives and the music, respectively, of early Spanish theatre. Neo-Aristotelian criticism and liturgical dramas, on the other hand, contributed literary and moralistic perspectives. In turn, Spanish Golden Age theatre has dramatically influenced the theatre of later generations in Europe and throughout the world. Spanish drama had an immediate and significant impact on the contemporary developments in English Renaissance theatre. It has also had a lasting impact on theatre throughout the Spanish speaking world. Additionally, a growing number of works are being translated, increasing the reach of Spanish Golden Age theatre and strengthening its reputation among critics and theatre patrons.

French Classical theatre
Notable playwrights:
Pierre Corneille (1606–84)
Molière (1622–73)
Jean Racine (1639–99)

Cretan Renaissance theatre

Greek theater was alive and flourishing on the island of Crete.  During the Cretan Renaissance two notable Greek playwrights Georgios Chortatzis and Vitsentzos Kornaros were present in the latter part of the 16th century.

Restoration comedy

After public stage performances had been banned for 18 years by the Puritan regime, the re-opening of the theatres in 1660 signalled a renaissance of English drama. With the restoration of the monarch in 1660 came the restoration of and the reopening of the theatre. English comedies written and performed in the Restoration period from 1660 to 1710 are collectively called "Restoration comedy". Restoration comedy is notorious for its sexual explicitness, a quality encouraged by Charles II (1660–1685) personally and by the rakish aristocratic ethos of his court. For the first time women were allowed to act, putting an end to the practice of the boy-player taking the parts of women. Socially diverse audiences included both aristocrats, their servants and hangers-on, and a substantial middle-class segment. Restoration audiences liked to see good triumph in their tragedies and rightful government restored. In comedy they liked to see the love-lives of the young and fashionable, with a central couple bringing their courtship to a successful conclusion (often overcoming the opposition of the elders to do so). Heroines had to be chaste, but were independent-minded and outspoken; now that they were played by women, there was more mileage for the playwright in disguising them in men's clothes or giving them narrow escape from rape. These playgoers were attracted to the comedies by up-to-the-minute topical writing, by crowded and bustling plots, by the introduction of the first professional actresses, and by the rise of the first celebrity actors. To non-theatre-goers these comedies were widely seen as licentious and morally suspect, holding up the antics of a small, privileged, and decadent class for admiration. This same class dominated the audiences of the Restoration theatre. This period saw the first professional woman playwright, Aphra Behn.

As a reaction to the decadence of Charles II era productions, sentimental comedy grew in popularity. This genre focused on encouraging virtuous behavior by showing middle class characters overcoming a series of moral trials. Playwrights like Colley Cibber and Richard Steele believed that humans were inherently good but capable of being led astray. Through plays such as The Conscious Lovers and Love's Last Shift they strove to appeal to an audience's noble sentiments in order that viewers could be reformed.

Restoration spectacular

The Restoration spectacular, or elaborately staged "machine play", hit the London public stage in the late 17th-century Restoration period, enthralling audiences with action, music, dance, moveable scenery, baroque illusionistic painting, gorgeous costumes, and special effects such as trapdoor tricks, "flying" actors, and fireworks. These shows have always had a bad reputation as a vulgar and commercial threat to the witty, "legitimate" Restoration drama; however, they drew Londoners in unprecedented numbers and left them dazzled and delighted.

Basically home-grown and with roots in the early 17th-century court masque, though never ashamed of borrowing ideas and stage technology from French opera, the spectaculars are sometimes called "English opera". However, the variety of them is so untidy that most theatre historians despair of defining them as a genre at all. Only a handful of works of this period are usually accorded the term "opera", as the musical dimension of most of them is subordinate to the visual. It was spectacle and scenery that drew in the crowds, as shown by many comments in the diary of the theatre-lover Samuel Pepys. The expense of mounting ever more elaborate scenic productions drove the two competing theatre companies into a dangerous spiral of huge expenditure and correspondingly huge losses or profits. A fiasco such as John Dryden's Albion and Albanius would leave a company in serious debt, while blockbusters like Thomas Shadwell's Psyche or Dryden's King Arthur would put it comfortably in the black for a long time.

Neoclassical theatre

Neoclassicism was the dominant form of theatre in the 18th century. It demanded decorum and rigorous adherence to the classical unities. Neoclassical theatre as well as the time period is characterized by its grandiosity. The costumes and scenery were intricate and elaborate. The acting is characterized by large gestures and melodrama. Neoclassical theatre encompasses the Restoration, Augustan, and Johnstinian Ages. In one sense, the neo-classical age directly follows the time of the Renaissance.

Theatres of the early 18th century – sexual farces of the Restoration were superseded by politically satirical comedies, 1737 Parliament passed the Stage Licensing Act 1737 which introduced state censorship of public performances and limited the number of theatres in London to two.

Nineteenth-century theatre

Theatre in the 19th century is divided into two parts: early and late. The early period was dominated by melodrama and Romanticism.

Beginning in France, melodrama became the most popular theatrical form. August von Kotzebue's Misanthropy and Repentance (1789) is often considered the first melodramatic play. The plays of Kotzebue and René Charles Guilbert de Pixérécourt established melodrama as the dominant dramatic form of the early 19th century.

In Germany, there was a trend toward historical accuracy in costumes and settings, a revolution in theatre architecture, and the introduction of the theatrical form of German Romanticism. Influenced by trends in 19th-century philosophy and the visual arts, German writers were increasingly fascinated with their Teutonic past and had a growing sense of nationalism. The plays of Gotthold Ephraim Lessing, Johann Wolfgang von Goethe, Friedrich Schiller, and other Sturm und Drang playwrights inspired a growing faith in feeling and instinct as guides to moral behavior.

In Britain, Percy Bysshe Shelley and Lord Byron were the most important dramatists of their time although Shelley's plays were not performed until later in the century. In the minor theatres, burletta and melodrama were the most popular. Kotzebue's plays were translated into English and Thomas Holcroft's A Tale of Mystery was the first of many English melodramas. Pierce Egan, Douglas William Jerrold, Edward Fitzball, and John Baldwin Buckstone initiated a trend towards more contemporary and rural stories in preference to the usual historical or fantastical melodramas. James Sheridan Knowles and Edward Bulwer-Lytton established a "gentlemanly" drama that began to re-establish the former prestige of the theatre with the aristocracy.

The later period of the 19th century saw the rise of two conflicting types of drama: realism and non-realism, such as Symbolism and precursors of Expressionism.

Realism began earlier in the 19th century in Russia than elsewhere in Europe and took a more uncompromising form. Beginning with the plays of Ivan Turgenev (who used "domestic detail to reveal inner turmoil"), Aleksandr Ostrovsky (who was Russia's first professional playwright), Aleksey Pisemsky (whose A Bitter Fate (1859) anticipated Naturalism), and Leo Tolstoy (whose The Power of Darkness (1886) is "one of the most effective of naturalistic plays"), a tradition of psychological realism in Russia culminated with the establishment of the Moscow Art Theatre by Konstantin Stanislavski and Vladimir Nemirovich-Danchenko.

The most important theatrical force in later 19th-century Germany was that of Georg II, Duke of Saxe-Meiningen and his Meiningen Ensemble, under the direction of Ludwig Chronegk. The Ensemble's productions are often considered the most historically accurate of the 19th century, although his primary goal was to serve the interests of the playwright. The Meiningen Ensemble stands at the beginning of the new movement toward unified production (or what Richard Wagner would call the Gesamtkunstwerk) and the rise of the director (at the expense of the actor) as the dominant artist in theatre-making.

Naturalism, a theatrical movement born out of Charles Darwin's The Origin of Species (1859) and contemporary political and economic conditions, found its main proponent in Émile Zola. The realisation of Zola's ideas was hindered by a lack of capable dramatists writing naturalist drama. André Antoine emerged in the 1880s with his Théâtre Libre that was only open to members and therefore was exempt from censorship. He quickly won the approval of Zola and began to stage Naturalistic works and other foreign realistic pieces.

In Britain, melodramas, light comedies, operas, Shakespeare and classic English drama, Victorian burlesque, pantomimes, translations of French farces and, from the 1860s, French operettas, continued to be popular. So successful were the comic operas of Gilbert and Sullivan, such as H.M.S. Pinafore (1878) and The Mikado (1885), that they greatly expanded the audience for musical theatre. This, together with much improved street lighting and transportation in London and New York led to a late Victorian and Edwardian theatre building boom in the West End and on Broadway. Later, the work of Henry Arthur Jones and Arthur Wing Pinero initiated a new direction on the English stage.

While their work paved the way, the development of more significant drama owes itself most to the playwright Henrik Ibsen. Ibsen was born in Norway in 1828. He wrote twenty-five plays, the most famous of which are A Doll's House (1879), Ghosts (1881), The Wild Duck (1884), and Hedda Gabler (1890). In addition, his works Rosmersholm (1886) and When We Dead Awaken (1899) evoke a sense of mysterious forces at work in human destiny, which was to be a major theme of symbolism and the so-called "Theatre of the Absurd".

After Ibsen, British theatre experienced revitalization with the work of George Bernard Shaw, Oscar Wilde, John Galsworthy, William Butler Yeats, and Harley Granville Barker. Unlike most of the gloomy and intensely serious work of their contemporaries, Shaw and Wilde wrote primarily in the comic form. Edwardian musical comedies were extremely popular, appealing to the tastes of the middle class in the Gay Nineties and catering to the public's preference for escapist entertainment during World War 1.

Twentieth-century theatre

While much 20th-century theatre continued and extended the projects of realism and Naturalism, there was also a great deal of experimental theatre that rejected those conventions. These experiments form part of the modernist and postmodernist movements and included forms of political theatre as well as more aesthetically orientated work. Examples include: Epic theatre, the Theatre of Cruelty, and the so-called "Theatre of the Absurd".

The term theatre practitioner came to be used to describe someone who both creates theatrical performances and who produces a theoretical discourse that informs their practical work. A theatre practitioner may be a director, a dramatist, an actor, or—characteristically—often a combination of these traditionally separate roles. "Theatre practice" describes the collective work that various theatre practitioners do. It is used to describe theatre praxis from Konstantin Stanislavski's development of his 'system', through Vsevolod Meyerhold's biomechanics, Bertolt Brecht's epic and Jerzy Grotowski's poor theatre, down to the present day, with contemporary theatre practitioners including Augusto Boal with his Theatre of the Oppressed, Dario Fo's popular theatre, Eugenio Barba's theatre anthropology and Anne Bogart's viewpoints.

Other key figures of 20th-century theatre include: Antonin Artaud, August Strindberg, Anton Chekhov, Frank Wedekind, Maurice Maeterlinck, Federico García Lorca, Eugene O'Neill, Luigi Pirandello, George Bernard Shaw, Gertrude Stein, Ernst Toller, Vladimir Mayakovsky, Arthur Miller, Tennessee Williams, Jean Genet, Eugène Ionesco, Samuel Beckett, Harold Pinter, Friedrich Dürrenmatt, Heiner Müller, and Caryl Churchill.

A number of aesthetic movements continued or emerged in the 20th century, including:
Naturalism
Realism
Dadaism
Expressionism
Surrealism and the Theatre of Cruelty
Theatre of the Absurd
Postmodernism
Agitprop

After the great popularity of the British Edwardian musical comedies, the American musical theatre came to dominate the musical stage, beginning with the Princess Theatre musicals, followed by the works of the Gershwin brothers, Cole Porter, Jerome Kern, Rodgers and Hart, and later Rodgers and Hammerstein.

American theatre

1752 to 1895 Romanticism 

Throughout most of history, English belles lettres and theatre have been separated, but these two art forms are interconnected. However, if they do not learn how to work hand-in-hand, it can be detrimental to the art form. The prose of English literature and the stories it tells needs to be performed and theatre has that capacity. From the start American theatre has been unique and diverse, reflecting society as America chased after its National identity. The very first play performed, in 1752 in Williamsburg Virginia, was Shakespeare's "The Merchant of Venice." Due to a strong Christian society, theatre was banned from 1774 until 1789. This societal standard was due to the Bible being sacred and any other diversions (entertainment) were seen as inappropriate, frivolous (without purpose), and sensual (pleasurable). During the ban, theatre often hid by titling itself as moral lectures. Theatre took a brief pause because of the revolutionary war, but quickly resumed after the war ended in 1781. Theatre began to spread west, and often towns had theatres before they had sidewalks or sewers. There were several leading professional theatre companies early on, but one of the most influential was in Philadelphia (1794–1815); however, the company had shaky roots because of the ban on theatre.

As the country expanded so did theatre; following the war of 1812 theatre headed west. Many of the new theatres were community run, but in New Orleans a professional theatre had been started by the French in 1791. Several troupes broke off and established a theatre in Cincinnati, Ohio. The first official west theatre came in 1815 when Samuel Drake (1769–1854) took his professional theatre company from Albany to Pittsburgh to the Ohio River and Kentucky. Along with this circuit he would sometimes take the troupe to Lexington, Louisville, and Frankfort. At times, he would lead the troupe to Ohio, Indiana, Tennessee, and Missouri. While there were circuit riding troupes, more permanent theatre communities out west often sat on rivers so there would be easy boat access. During this time period very few theatres were above the Ohio River, and in fact Chicago did not have a permanent theatre until 1833. Because of the turbulent times in America and the economic crisis happening due to wars, theatre during its most expansive time, experienced bankruptcy and change of management. Also most early American theatre had great European influence because many of the actors had been English born and trained. Between 1800 and 1850 neoclassical philosophy almost completely passed away under romanticism which was a great influence of 19th century American theatre that idolized the "noble savage." Due to new psychological discoveries and acting methods, eventually romanticism would give birth to realism. This trend toward realism occurred between 1870 and 1895.

1895 to 1945 Realism 

In this era of theatre, the moral hero shifts to the modern man who is a product of his environment. This major shift is due in part to the civil war because America was now stained with its own blood, having lost its innocence.

1945 to 1990 

During this period of theatre, Hollywood emerged and threatened American theatre. However theatre during this time didn't decline but in fact was renowned and noticed worldwide. Tennessee Williams and Arthur Miller achieved worldwide fame during this period.

African theatre

Egyptian theatre

Ancient Egyptian quasi-theatrical events
The earliest recorded quasi-theatrical event dates back to 2000 BC with the "passion plays" of Ancient Egypt. The story of the god Osiris was performed annually at festivals throughout the civilization.

Modern Egyptian theater

Egypt has known the art of theater through seven thousand years, through the mid ages. In the modern era, the art of theater was evolved in the second half of the nineteenth century through interaction with Europe. As well as the development of popular theatrical forms that Egypt knew thousands of years before this date.

The beginning was by Yaqub Sanu and Abu Khalil al-Qabbani, then the situation was divided into free theatrical groups, including the Youssef Wahbi troupe such as Fatima Rushdi, which presents tragedy or tragedy, and Abo El Seoud El Ebiary, Ismail Yassine, Badie' Khayri, Ali El Kassar and Naguib El-Rihani in presenting comedy in another way.

More than 350 plays were presented in the so-called halls theater in the 1930s and 1940s, co-presented by Bayram El-Tunisi, Amin Sedky, Badie' Khayri and Abo El Seoud El Ebiary and directed by Aziz Eid, Bishara Wakim and Abdel Aziz Khalil. In addition to important statistics, including that the longest-lived private sector group is the Rihani band. Its activity lasted 67 years, starting from 1916 until 1983, nearly seventy years. The most prolific private sector group is the Ramses Troupe, which produced more than 240 plays from 1923 to 1960. The longest-lived state theater troupe is the National Theater Troupe, which lasted for over 80 years, starting from 1935 until now.

After the 1952 revolution, there was a group of playwrights such as Alfred Farag, and Ali Salem, Noaman Ashour, Saad Eddin Wahba and others.  Zaki, as for the country teams, the most prolific directors in production are the artists Fattouh Nashati, and Zaki Tulaimat.

Among the Egyptian playwrights whose works were presented on stage are Amin Sedky, Badi’ Khairy, Abu Al-Saud Al-Ebiary, and Tawfiq Al-Hakim. Most of the world's playwrights whose works were presented on the stage are Moliere, Pierre Corneille and William Shakespeare.

The women's imprint was clear in the history of Egyptian theater, which Mounira El Mahdeya started as the first Egyptian singer and actress, and the founder of a theater group in her name at the beginning of the twentieth century instead of Levantines and Jews. Before that time, women were forbidden to act, which caused a noise that contributed to the increase in her fame. And Mounira El Mahdeya was also the one who discovered the musician of the generations, Mohammed Abdel Wahab, and gave him the opportunity to complete the melodies of Cleopatra and Mark Antony's play after the sudden death of Sayed Darwish. She encouraged him to stand in front of her, embodying the role of Mark Antonio in the same show. Starting from early 1960s, movie stars started invading theaters such as Salah Zulfikar in A Bullet in the Heart of 1964, based on Tawfiq Al-Hakim's 1933 novel, and many others. In the 1970s, the comedy was the dominant such as Al Ayal Kibrit of 1979.

In 2020, the Egyptian Minister of Culture, Dr.  Ines Abdel-Dayem dedicates the next session of the National Festival of Egyptian Theater to celebrate the 150th anniversary of the beginning of the modern Egyptian theater.  It will review the findings of the research team, consisting of Amr Dawara, the theater memory guard, who started since 1993 to prepare the largest Egyptian theater encyclopedia that includes all the details of professional theatrical performances during fifteen decades, starting from 1870 by Yacub Sanu until 2019, during which the number of performances reached 6300 professional works, which were presented to the public for a fee at the box office. And addressed the book body to print the encyclopedia. And that encyclopedia will help the reader and researcher to know the masterpieces and creations of Egyptian theater throughout its history.

West African theatre

Ghanaian theatre
Modern theatre in Ghana emerged in the early 20th century.
It emerged first as literary comment on the colonization of Africa by Europe. Among the earliest work in which this can be seen is The Blinkards written by Kobina Sekyi in 1915. The Blinkards is a blatant satire about the Africans who embraced the European culture that was brought to them. In it Sekyi demeans three groups of individuals: anyone European, anyone who imitates the Europeans, and the rich African cocoa farmer. This sudden rebellion though was just the beginning spark of Ghanaian literary theatre.

A play that has similarity in its satirical view is Anowa. Written by Ghanaian author Ama Ata Aidoo, it begins with its eponymous heroine Anowa rejecting her many arranged suitors' marriage proposals. She insists on making her own decisions as to whom she is going to marry. The play stresses the need for gender equality, and respect for women. This ideal of independence, as well as equality leads Anowa down a winding path of both happiness and misery. Anowa chooses a man of her own to marry. Anowa supports her husband Kofi both physically and emotionally. Through her support Kofi does prosper in wealth, but becomes poor as a spiritual being. Through his accumulation of wealth Kofi loses himself in it. His once happy marriage with Anowa becomes changed when he begins to hire slaves rather than doing any labor himself. This to Anowa does not make sense because it makes Kofi no better than the European colonists whom she detests for the way that she feels they have used the people of Africa. Their marriage is childless, which is presumed to have been caused by a ritual that Kofi has done trading his manhood for wealth. Anowa's viewing Kofi's slave-gotten wealth and inability to have a child leads to her committing suicide. The name Anowa means "Superior moral force" while Kofi's means only "Born on Friday". This difference in even the basis of their names seems to implicate the moral superiority of women in a male run society.

Another play of significance is The Marriage of Anansewa, written in 1975 by Efua Sutherland. The entire play is based upon an Akan oral tradition called Anansesem (folk tales). The main character of the play is Ananse (the spider). The qualities of Ananse are one of the most prevalent parts of the play. Ananse is cunning, selfish, has great insight into human and animal nature, is ambitious, eloquent, and resourceful. By putting too much of himself into everything that he does Ananse ruins each of his schemes and ends up poor. Ananse is used in the play as a kind of Everyman. He is written in an exaggerated sense in order to force the process of self-examination. Ananse is used as a way to spark a conversation for change in the society of anyone reading. The play tells of Ananse attempting to marry off his daughter Anansewa off to any of a selection of rich chiefs, or another sort of wealthy suitor simultaneously, in order to raise money. Eventually all the suitors come to his house at once, and he has to use all of his cunning to defuse the situation. The storyteller not only narrates but also enacts, reacts to, and comments on the action of the tale. Along with this, Mbuguous is used, Mbuguous is the name given to very specialized sect of Ghanaian theatre technique that allows for audience participation. The Mbuguous of this tale are songs that embellish the tale or comment on it. Spontaneity through this technique as well as improvisation are used enough to meet any standard of modern theatre.

Yoruba theatre

In his pioneering study of Yoruba theatre, Joel Adedeji traced its origins to the masquerade of the Egungun (the "cult of the ancestor"). The traditional ceremony culminates in the essence of the masquerade where it is deemed that ancestors return to the world of the living to visit their descendants. In addition to its origin in ritual, Yoruba theatre can be "traced to the 'theatrogenic' nature of a number of the deities in the Yoruba pantheon, such as Obatala the arch divinity, Ogun the divinity of creativeness, as well as Iron and technology, and Sango the divinity of the storm", whose reverence is imbued "with drama and theatre and the symbolic overall relevance in terms of its relative interpretation."

The Aláàrìnjó theatrical tradition sprang from the Egungun masquerade in the 16th century. The Aláàrìnjó was a troupe of traveling performers whose masked forms carried an air of mystique. They created short, satirical scenes that drew on a number of established stereotypical characters. Their performances utilised mime, music and acrobatics. The Aláàrìnjó tradition influenced the popular traveling theatre, which was the most prevalent and highly developed form of theatre in Nigeria from the 1950s to the 1980s. In the 1990s, the popular traveling theatre moved into television and film and now gives live performances only rarely.

"Total theatre" also developed in Nigeria in the 1950s. It utilised non-Naturalistic techniques, surrealistic physical imagery, and exercised a flexible use of language. Playwrights writing in the mid-1970s made use of some of these techniques, but articulated them with "a radical appreciation of the problems of society."

Traditional performance modes have strongly influenced the major figures in contemporary Nigerian theatre. The work of Hubert Ogunde (sometimes referred to as the "father of contemporary Yoruban theatre") was informed by the Aláàrìnjó tradition and Egungun masquerades. Wole Soyinka, who is "generally recognized as Africa's greatest living playwright", gives the divinity Ogun a complex metaphysical significance in his work. In his essay "The Fourth Stage" (1973), Soyinka contrasts Yoruba drama with classical Athenian drama, relating both to the 19th-century German philosopher Friedrich Nietzsche's analysis of the latter in The Birth of Tragedy (1872). Ogun, he argues, is "a totality of the Dionysian, Apollonian and Promethean virtues."

The proponents of the travelling theatre in Nigeria include Duro Ladipo and Moses Olaiya (a popular comic act). These practitioners contributed much to the field of African theatre during the period of mixture and experimentation of the indigenous with the Western theatre.

African Diaspora theatre

African-American theatre
The history of African-American theatre has a dual origin. The first is rooted in local theatre where African Americans performed in cabins and parks. Their performances (folk tales, songs, music, and dance) were rooted in the African culture before being influenced by the American environment. African Grove Theatre was the first African-American theatre established in 1821 by William Henry Brown.

Asian theatre

Indian theatre

Overview of Indian theatre

The earliest form of Indian theatre was the Sanskrit theatre. It emerged sometime between the 15th century BC and the 1st century and flourished between the 1st century and the 10th, which was a period of relative peace in the history of India during which hundreds of plays were written. Vedic text such as Rigveda provides evidences of drama plays being enacted during Yajna ceremonies. The dialogues mentioned in the texts range from one person monologue to three-person dialogue, for instance, the dialogue between Indra, Indrani and Vrishakapi. The dialogues are not only religious in their context but also secular for instance one rigvedic monologue is about a gambler whose life is ruined because of it and has estranged his wife and his parents also hate him. Panini in 5th century BC mentions a dramatic text Natasutra written by two Indian dramatists Shilalin and Krishashva. Patanjali also mentions the name of plays which have been lost such as kemsavadha and Balibandha. Sitabenga caves dating back to 3rd century BC and Khandagiri caves from 2nd century BC are the earliest examples of theatre architecture in India.  With the Islamic conquests that began in the 10th and 11th centuries, theatre was discouraged or forbidden entirely. Later, in an attempt to re-assert indigenous values and ideas, village theatre was encouraged across the subcontinent, developing in a large number of regional languages from the 15th to the 19th centuries. Modern Indian theatre developed during the period of colonial rule under the British Empire, from the mid-19th century until the mid-20th.

Sanskrit theatre 

The earliest-surviving fragments of Sanskrit drama date from the 1st century. The wealth of archaeological evidence from earlier periods offers no indication of the existence of a tradition of theatre. The Vedas (the earliest Indian literature, from between 1500 and 600 BC) contain no hint of it; although a small number of hymns are composed in a form of dialogue), the rituals of the Vedic period do not appear to have developed into theatre. The Mahābhāṣya by Patañjali contains the earliest reference to what may have been the seeds of Sanskrit drama. This treatise on grammar from 140 BC provides a feasible date for the beginnings of theatre in India.

However, although there are no surviving fragments of any drama prior to this date, it is possible that early Buddhist literature provides the earliest evidence for the existence of Indian theatre. The Pali suttas (ranging in date from the 5th to 3rd centuries BCE) refer to the existence of troupes of actors (led by a chief actor), who performed dramas on a stage. It is indicated that these dramas incorporated dance, but were listed as a distinct form of performance, alongside dancing, singing, and story recitations. (According to later Buddhist texts, King Bimbisara, a contemporary of Gautama Buddha, had a drama performed for another king. This would be as early as the 5th century BCE, but the event is only described in much later texts, from the 3rd-4th centuries CE.)

The major source of evidence for Sanskrit theatre is A Treatise on Theatre (Nātyaśāstra), a compendium whose date of composition is uncertain (estimates range from 200 BC to 200 AD) and whose authorship is attributed to Bharata Muni. The Treatise is the most complete work of dramaturgy in the ancient world. It addresses acting, dance, music, dramatic construction, architecture, costuming, make-up, props, the organisation of companies, the audience, competitions, and offers a mythological account of the origin of theatre. In doing so, it provides indications about the nature of actual theatrical practices. Sanskrit theatre was performed on sacred ground by priests who had been trained in the necessary skills (dance, music, and recitation) in a [hereditary process]. Its aim was both to educate and to entertain.

Under the patronage of royal courts, performers belonged to professional companies that were directed by a stage manager (sutradhara), who may also have acted. This task was thought of as being analogous to that of a puppeteer—the literal meaning of "sutradhara" is "holder of the strings or threads". The performers were trained rigorously in vocal and physical technique. There were no prohibitions against female performers; companies were all-male, all-female, and of mixed gender. Certain sentiments were considered inappropriate for men to enact, however, and were thought better suited to women. Some performers played character their own age, while others played those different from their own (whether younger or older). Of all the elements of theatre, the Treatise gives most attention to acting (abhinaya), which consists of two styles: realistic (lokadharmi) and conventional (natyadharmi), though the major focus is on the latter.

Its drama is regarded as the highest achievement of Sanskrit literature. It utilised stock characters, such as the hero, heroine, or clown. Actors may have specialised in a particular type. Kālidāsa in the 1st century BC, is arguably considered to be ancient India's greatest Sanskrit dramatist. Three famous romantic plays written by Kālidāsa are the Mālavikāgnimitram (Mālavikā and Agnimitra), Vikramuurvashiiya (Pertaining to Vikrama and Urvashi), and Abhijñānaśākuntala (The Recognition of Shakuntala). The last was inspired by a story in the Mahabharata and is the most famous. It was the first to be translated into English and German. Śakuntalā (in English translation) influenced Goethe's Faust (1808–1832).

The next great Indian dramatist was Bhavabhuti (c. 7th century). He is said to have written the following three plays: Malati-Madhava, Mahaviracharita and Uttar Ramacharita. Among these three, the last two cover between them the entire epic of Ramayana. The powerful Indian emperor Harsha (606–648) is credited with having written three plays: the comedy Ratnavali, Priyadarsika, and the Buddhist drama Nagananda.

Traditional Indian theatre

Kutiyattam is the only surviving specimen of the ancient Sanskrit theatre, thought to have originated around the beginning of the Common Era, and is officially recognised by UNESCO as a Masterpiece of the Oral and Intangible Heritage of Humanity. In addition, many forms of Indian folk theatre abound. Bhavai (strolling players) is a popular folk theatre form of Gujarat, said to have arisen in the 14th century AD. Bhaona and Ankiya Nats have been practicing in Assam since the early 16th century which were created and initiated by Mahapurusha Srimanta Sankardeva. Jatra has been popular in Bengal and its origin is traced to the Bhakti movement in the 16th century. Another folk theatre form popular in Haryana, Uttar Pradesh and Malwa region of Madhya Pradesh is Swang, which is dialogue-oriented rather than movement-oriented and is considered to have arisen in its present form in the late 18th – early 19th centuries. Yakshagana is a very popular theatre art in Karnataka and has existed under different names at least since the 16th century. It is semi-classical in nature and involves music and songs based on carnatic music, rich costumes, storylines based on the Mahabharata and Ramayana. It also employs spoken dialogue in-between its songs that gives it a folk art flavour. Kathakali is a form of dance-drama, characteristic of Kerala, that arose in the 17th century, developing from the temple-art plays Krishnanattam and Ramanattam.

Kathakali

Kathakali is a highly stylised classical Indian dance-drama noted for the attractive make-up of characters, elaborate costumes, detailed gestures, and well-defined body movements presented in tune with the anchor playback music and complementary percussion. It originated in the country's present-day state of Kerala during the 17th century and has developed over the years with improved looks, refined gestures and added themes besides more ornate singing and precise drumming.

Modern Indian theatre
Rabindranath Tagore was a pioneering modern playwright who wrote plays noted for their exploration and questioning of nationalism, identity, spiritualism and material greed. His plays are written in Bengali and include Chitra (Chitrangada, 1892), The King of the Dark Chamber (Raja, 1910), The Post Office (Dakghar, 1913), and Red Oleander (Raktakarabi, 1924).

Chinese theatre

Shang theatre
There are references to theatrical entertainments in China as early as 1500 BC during the Shang dynasty; they often involved music, clowning and acrobatic displays.

Han and Tang theatre
During the Han dynasty, shadow puppetry first emerged as a recognized form of theatre in China. There were two distinct forms of shadow puppetry, Cantonese southern and Pekingese northern. The two styles were differentiated by the method of making the puppets and the positioning of the rods on the puppets, as opposed to the type of play performed by the puppets. Both styles generally performed plays depicting great adventure and fantasy, rarely was this very stylized form of theatre used for political propaganda. Cantonese shadow puppets were the larger of the two. They were built using thick leather which created more substantial shadows. Symbolic color was also very prevalent; a black face represented honesty, a red one bravery. The rods used to control Cantonese puppets were attached perpendicular to the puppets' heads. Thus, they were not seen by the audience when the shadow was created. Pekingese puppets were more delicate and smaller. They were created out of thin, translucent leather usually taken from the belly of a donkey. They were painted with vibrant paints, thus they cast a very colorful shadow. The thin rods which controlled their movements were attached to a leather collar at the neck of the puppet. The rods ran parallel to the bodies of the puppet then turned at a ninety degree angle to connect to the neck. While these rods were visible when the shadow was cast, they laid outside the shadow of the puppet; thus they did not interfere with the appearance of the figure. The rods attached at the necks to facilitate the use of multiple heads with one body. When the heads were not being used, they were stored in a muslin book or fabric lined box. The heads were always removed at night. This was in keeping with the old superstition that if left intact, the puppets would come to life at night. Some puppeteers went so far as to store the heads in one book and the bodies in another, to further reduce the possibility of reanimating puppets. Shadow puppetry is said to have reached its highest point of artistic development in the 11th century before becoming a tool of the government.

The Tang dynasty is sometimes known as 'The Age of 1000 Entertainments'. During this era, Emperor Xuanzong formed an acting school known as the Children of the Pear Garden to produce a form of drama that was primarily musical.

Song and Yuan theatre

In the Song dynasty, there were many popular plays involving acrobatics and music. These developed in the Yuan dynasty into a more sophisticated form with a four- or five-act structure.

Yuan drama spread across China and diversified into numerous regional forms, the best known of which is Beijing Opera, which is still popular today.

Indonesian theatre

Indonesian theatre has become an important part of local culture, theater performances in Indonesia have been developed for hundreds of years. Most of Indonesia's older theatre forms are linked directly to local literary traditions (oral and written). The prominent puppet theatres — wayang golek (wooden rod-puppet play) of the Sundanese and wayang kulit (leather shadow-puppet play) of the Javanese and Balinese—draw much of their repertoire from indigenized versions of the Ramayana and Mahabharata. These tales also provide source material for the wayang wong (human theatre) of Java and Bali, which uses actors. Wayang wong is a type of classical Javanese dance theatrical performance with themes taken from episodes of the Ramayana or Mahabharata. The bas relief panels on the 9th-century of Prambanan temple show episodes of the Ramayana epic. The adaptation of Mahabharata episodes has been integrated in the Javanese literature tradition since the Kahuripan and Kediri era, with notable examples such as Arjunawiwaha, composed by Mpu Kanwa in the 11th century. The Penataran temple in East Java depicts themes from the Ramayana and Mahabharata in its bas reliefs. Wayang wong was a performance in the style of wayang kulit (the shadow theatre of Central Java) wherein actors and actresses took the puppets' roles. The first written reference to the form is on the stone inscription Wimalarama from East Java dated 930 CE. The genre is currently done in masked and unmasked variations in Central Java, Bali, and Cirebon, as well as in Sundanese (West Java).

Khmer theatre
In Cambodia, at the ancient capital Angkor Wat, stories from the Indian epics Ramayana and Mahabharata have been carved on the walls of temples and palaces.

Thai theatre

In Thailand, it has been a tradition from the Middle Ages to stage plays based on plots drawn from Indian epics. In particular, the theatrical version of Thailand's national epic Ramakien, a version of the Indian Ramayana, remains popular in Thailand even today.

Philippine theatre
During the 333-year reign of the Spanish government, they introduced into the islands the Catholic religion and the Spanish way of life, which gradually merged with the indigenous culture to form the “lowland folk culture” now shared by the major ethnolinguistic groups. Today, the dramatic forms introduced or influenced by Spain continue to live in rural areas all over the archipelago. These forms include the komedya, the playlets, the sinakulo, the sarswela, and the drama. In recent years, some of these forms have been revitalized to make them more responsive to the conditions and needs of a developing nation.

Japanese theatre

Noh

During the 14th century, there were small companies of actors in Japan who performed short, sometimes vulgar comedies. A director of one of these companies, Kan'ami (1333–1384), had a son, Zeami Motokiyo (1363–1443) who was considered one of the finest child actors in Japan. When Kan'ami's company performed for Ashikaga Yoshimitsu (1358–1408), the Shōgun of Japan, he implored Zeami to have a court education for his arts. After Zeami succeeded his father, he continued to perform and adapt his style into what is today Noh. A mixture of pantomime and vocal acrobatics, this style has fascinated the Japanese for hundreds of years.

Bunraku

Japan, after a long period of civil wars and political disarray, was unified and at peace primarily due to shōgun Tokugawa Ieyasu (1543–1616). However, alarmed at increasing Christian growth, he cut off contact from Japan to Europe and China and outlawed Christianity. When peace did come, a flourish of cultural influence and growing merchant class demanded its own entertainment. The first form of theatre to flourish was Ningyō jōruri (commonly referred to as Bunraku). The founder of and main contributor to Ningyō jōruri, Chikamatsu Monzaemon (1653–1725), turned his form of theatre into a true art form. Ningyō jōruri is a highly stylized form of theatre using puppets, today about 1/3d the size of a human. The men who control the puppets train their entire lives to become master puppeteers, when they can then operate the puppet's head and right arm and choose to show their faces during the performance. The other puppeteers, controlling the less important limbs of the puppet, cover themselves and their faces in a black suit, to imply their invisibility. The dialogue is handled by a single person, who uses varied tones of voice and speaking manners to simulate different characters. Chikamatsu wrote thousands of plays during his career, most of which are still used today. They wore masks instead of elaborate makeup. Masks define their gender, personality, and moods the actor is in.

Kabuki

Kabuki began shortly after Bunraku, legend has it by an actress named Okuni, who lived around the end of the 16th century. Most of Kabuki's material came from Nõ and Bunraku, and its erratic dance-type movements are also an effect of Bunraku. However, Kabuki is less formal and more distant than Nõ, yet very popular among the Japanese public. Actors are trained in many varied things including dancing, singing, pantomime, and even acrobatics. Kabuki was first performed by young girls, then by young boys, and by the end of the 16th century, Kabuki companies consisted of all men. The men who portrayed women on stage were specifically trained to elicit the essence of a woman in their subtle movements and gestures.

Butoh

Butoh is the collective name for a diverse range of activities, techniques and motivations for dance, performance, or movement inspired by the  movement. It typically involves playful and grotesque imagery, taboo topics, extreme or absurd environments, and is traditionally performed in white body makeup with slow hyper-controlled motion, with or without an audience. There is no set style, and it may be purely conceptual with no movement at all. Its origins have been attributed to Japanese dance legends Tatsumi Hijikata and Kazuo Ohno. Butoh appeared first in Japan following World War II and specifically after student riots. The roles of authority were now subject to challenge and subversion. It also appeared as a reaction against the contemporary dance scene in Japan, which Hijikata felt was based on the one hand on imitating the West and on the other on imitating the Noh. He critiqued the current state of dance as overly superficial.

Turkish theatre 
1st mention of theatre plays in Ottoman empire connected with appear of Spanish Jews there in the end of fifteenth - sixteenth centuries. Later other minorities, like Roma, Greeks, and Armenian became involved in the field. Afterwards Turkish equivalent of commedia dell'arte - the Orta oyunu became very popular all over the Empire.

Persian theatre

Medieval Islamic theatre
The most popular forms of theatre in the medieval Islamic world were puppet theatre (which included hand puppets, shadow plays and marionette productions) and live passion plays known as ta'ziya, in which actors re-enact episodes from Muslim history. In particular, Shia Islamic plays revolved around the shaheed (martyrdom) of Ali's sons Hasan ibn Ali and Husayn ibn Ali. Secular plays known as akhraja were recorded in medieval adab literature, though they were less common than puppetry and ta'ziya theatre.

See also

 Antitheatricality
 Cambridge History of British Theatre
 Development of musical theatre
 History of art
 History of dance
 History of figure skating
 History of film
 History of literature
 History of opera
 History of professional wrestling
 History of television
 Play (theatre)
 Radio drama

Notes

References

Sources

 Adejeji, Joel. 1969. "Traditional Yoruba Theatre." African Arts 3.1 (Spring): 60–63. 
 Banham, Martin, ed. 1995. The Cambridge Guide to Theatre. Rev. ed. Cambridge: Cambridge UP. .
 Banham, Martin, Errol Hill, and George Woodyard, eds. 2005. The Cambridge Guide to African and Caribbean Theatre. Cambridge: Cambridge UP. .
 Baumer, Rachel Van M., and James R. Brandon, eds. 1981. Sanskrit Theatre in Performance. Delhi: Motilal Banarsidass, 1993. .
 Beacham, Richard C. 1996. The Roman Theatre and Its Audience. Cambridge, MA: Harvard UP. .
 Benedetti, Jean. 1999. Stanislavski: His Life and Art. Revised edition. Original edition published in 1988. London: Methuen. .
 ––. 2005. The Art of the Actor: The Essential History of Acting, From Classical Times to the Present Day. London: Methuen. .
 Brandon, James R. 1981. Introduction. In Baumer and Brandon (1981, xvii–xx).
 ––, ed. 1997. The Cambridge Guide to Asian Theatre. 2nd, rev. ed. Cambridge: Cambridge UP. .
 Brinton, Crane, John B Christopher, and Robert Lee Wolff. 1981. Civilization in the West: Part 1 Prehistory to 1715. 4th ed. Englewood Cliffs, NJ: Prentice-Hall. .
 Brockett, Oscar G. and Franklin J. Hildy. 2003. History of the Theatre. Ninth edition, International edition. Boston: Allyn and Bacon. .
 Brown, Andrew. 1995. "Ancient Greece." In Banham (1995, 441–447).
 Cartledge, Paul. 1997. "'Deep Plays': Theatre as Process in Greek Civic Life." In Easterling (1997, 3–35).
 Cohen, Robert, and Donovan Sherman. 2020. "Chapter 7: Theatre Traditions." Theatre: Brief Edition. Twelfth ed. New York, NY. . .
 Counsell, Colin. 1996. Signs of Performance: An Introduction to Twentieth-Century Theatre. London and New York: Routledge. .
 Davidson, John. 2005. "Theatrical Production." In Gregory (2005, 194–211).
 Duffy, Eamon. 1992. The Stripping of the Altars: Traditional Religion in England, 1400–1580. New Haven: Yale UP. .
 Easterling, P. E., ed. 1997. The Cambridge Companion to Greek Tragedy. Cambridge Companions to Literature ser. Cambridge: Cambridge UP. .
 Falossi, F. and Mastropasqua, F. "L'Incanto Della Maschera." Vol. 1 Prinp Editore, Torino:2014 www.prinp.com 
 Finley, Moses I. 1991. The Ancient Greeks: An Introduction to their Life and Thought. London: Penguin. .
 Goldhill, Simon. 1997. "The Audience of Athenian Tragedy." In Easterling (1997, 54–68).
 ––. 1999. "Programme Notes." In Goldhill and Osborne (2004, 1–29).
 ––. 2008. "Generalizing About Tragedy." In Felski (2008b, 45–65).
 Goldhill, Simon, and Robin Osborne, eds. 2004. Performance Culture and Athenian Democracy. New edition. Cambridge: Cambridge UP. .
 Gregory, Justina, ed. 2005. A Companion to Greek Tragedy. Blackwell Companions to the Ancient World ser. Malden, MA and Oxford: Blackwell. .
 Grimsted, David. 1968. Melodrama Unveiled: American Theatre and Culture, 1800–50. Chicago: U of Chicago P. .
 Gurr, Andrew. 1992. The Shakespearean Stage 1574–1642. Third ed. Cambridge: Cambridge University Press. .
 Hume, Robert D. 1976. The Development of English Drama in the Late Seventeenth Century. Oxford: Clarendon Press. .
 Janko, Richard, trans. 1987. Poetics with Tractatus Coislinianus, Reconstruction of Poetics II and the Fragments of the On Poets. By Aristotle. Cambridge: Hackett. .
 Kovacs, David. 2005. "Text and Transmission." In Gregory (2005, 379–393).
 Ley, Graham. 2006. A Short Introduction to the Ancient Greek Theater. Rev. ed. Chicago and London: U of Chicago P. .
 –. 2007. The Theatricality of Greek Tragedy: Playing Space and Chorus. Chicago and London: U of Chicago P. .
 McCullough, Christopher, ed. 1998. Theatre Praxis: Teaching Drama Through Practice. New Directions in Theatre Ser. London: Macmillan. . New York: St Martin's P. .
 ––. 1996. Theatre and Europe (1957–1996). Intellect European Studies ser. Exeter: Intellect. .
 McDonald, Marianne. 2003. The Living Art of Greek Tragedy. Bloomington: Indiana UP. .
 McKay, John P., Bennett D. Hill, and John Buckler. 1996. A History of World Societies. 4th ed. Boston: Houghton Mifflin. .
 Milhous, Judith 1979. Thomas Betterton and the Management of Lincoln's Inn Fields 1695–1708. Carbondale, Illinois: Southern Illinois UP. .
 Milling, Jane, and Graham Ley. 2001. Modern Theories of Performance: From Stanislavski to Boal. Basingstoke, Hampshire and New York: Palgrave. .
 Moreh, Shmuel. 1986. "Live Theater in Medieval Islam." In Studies in Islamic History and Civilization in Honour of Professor David Ayalon. Ed. Moshe Sharon. Cana, Leiden: Brill. 565–601. .
 Munby, Julian, Richard Barber, and Richard Brown. 2007. Edward III's Round Table at Windsor: The House of the Round Table and the Windsor Festival of 1344. Arthurian Studies ser. Woodbridge: Boydell P. .
 Noret, Joël. 2008. "Between Authenticity and Nostalgia: The Making of a Yoruba Tradition in Southern Benin." African Arts 41.4 (Winter): 26–31.
 Pavis, Patrice. 1998. Dictionary of the Theatre: Terms, Concepts, and Analysis. Trans. Christine Shantz. Toronto and Buffalo: U of Toronto P. .
 Pelling, Christopher. 2005. "Tragedy, Rhetoric, and Performance Culture." In Gregory (2005, 83–102).
 Rehm, Rush. 1992. Greek Tragic Theatre. Theatre Production Studies ser. London and New York: Routledge. .
 Richmond, Farley. 1995. "India." In Banham (1995, 516–525).
 Richmond, Farley P., Darius L. Swann, and Phillip B. Zarrilli, eds. 1993. Indian Theatre: Traditions of Performance. U of Hawaii P. .
 Soyinka, Wole. 1973. "The Fourth Stage: Through the Mysteries of Ogun to the Origin of Yoruba Tragedy." In The Morality of Art: Essays Presented to G. Wilson Knight by his Colleagues and Friends. Ed. Douglas William Jefferson. London: Routledge and Kegan Paul. 119–134. .
 Styan, J. L. 2000. Drama: A Guide to the Study of Plays. New York: Peter Lang. .
 Taplin, Oliver. 2003. Greek Tragedy in Action. Second edition. London and New York: Routledge. .
 Taxidou, Olga. 2004. Tragedy, Modernity and Mourning. Edinburgh: Edinburgh UP. .
 Thornbrough, Emma Lou. 1996. The Ancient Greeks. Acton, MA: Copley. .
 Tsitsiridis, Stavros, "Greek Mime in the Roman Empire (P.Oxy. 413: Charition and Moicheutria", Logeion 1 (2011) 184–232.
 Vernant, Jean-Pierre, and Pierre Vidal-Naquet. 1988. Myth and Tragedy in Ancient Greece. Trans. Janet Lloyd. New York: Zone Books, 1990.
 Walton, J. Michael. 1997. Introduction. In Plays VI. By Euripides. Methuen Classical Greek Dramatists ser. London: Methuen. vii–xxii. .
 Williams, Raymond. 1966. Modern Tragedy. London: Chatto & Windus. .
 Zarrilli, Phillip B. 1984. The Kathakali Complex: Actor, Performance and Structure. [S.l.]: South Asia Books. .

External links

Theatre Collections of the Victoria and Albert Museum, with information and archive material
University of Bristol Theatre Collection, University of Bristol
Music Hall and Theatre History – an archive of historical information and material on British Theatre and Music Hall buildings.
Long running plays (over 400 performances) on Broadway, Off-Broadway, London, Toronto, Melbourne, Paris, Vienna, and Berlin
APGRD Database (Archive of Performances of Greek and Roman Drama), University of Oxford, ed. Amanda Wrigley
Women's Theatre History: Online Bibliography and Searchable Database at Langara College

 
Theatre
Performing arts
Theatre